Josephine Decker (born April 2, 1981) is an American actress, filmmaker, and performance artist. As of 2020 she has directed four experimental feature films: the psychological thriller Butter on the Latch (2013), the erotic thriller Thou Wast Mild and Lovely (2014), the coming-of-age drama Madeline's Madeline (2018), the semi-biographical thriller Shirley (2020), and the coming-of-age drama The Sky is Everywhere (2022). She also co-directed the documentary Bi the Way (2008) with Brittany Blockman.

Early life
Decker was raised in Texas. She graduated from Highland Park High School and Princeton University. As a child, she was interested in writing and playing the piano, and dreamed of being a photographer for National Geographic. The film that inspired her to become a filmmaker was Monsters, Inc.

Career

Film
Decker produced and directed her first short film, Naked Princeton, in 2005.

In 2008, Decker co-directed the documentary Bi the Way with Brittany Blockman, which focused on bisexuality in the United States. Despite being described by Variety'''s Joe Leydon as a "once-over-lightly examination of an alleged cultural phenomenon", the film went on to win the Alternative Spirit Grand Prize at the Rhode Island International Film Festival.

Decker wrote and directed her second short film, Where Are You Going, Elena?, in 2009. In 2012, she wrote and directed the short film Me the Terrible, which Richard Brody of The New Yorker called a "wondrous short film."

In 2013, Decker wrote, produced, and directed her first feature film, the experimental psychological thriller Butter on the Latch.  The film garnered praise from Eric Kohn of Indiewire, who said Decker's career was "one to keep an eye on", and Peter Debruge of Variety, who wrote that "Decker has fashioned the kind of feature debut the film industry simply doesn’t support, but would do well to encourage: a visually poetic, virtually free-form groove in which emotion, rather than narrative, guides viewers through a young woman’s visit to a Balkan folk music camp." Decker was included in Filmmaker Magazine 2013 list of 25 New Faces in Independent Film.

In early 2014, she completed her second theatrical film, the experimental erotic thriller Thou Wast Mild and Lovely, starring Sophie Traub and Decker's frequent collaborator Joe Swanberg. To raise money for the film's post-production, Decker ran a crowdfunding campaign on Kickstarter with a goal of $15,500. The campaign closed on August 22, 2013, having raised $18,517. In his review, Kohn gave the film a B+ and commented, "Its labyrinthine characteristics suggest the unholy marriage of Ingmar Bergman and David Lynch. While nowhere near the same level of refinement as those giants, Decker concocts a wholly enveloping vision of isolation told with a grimly poetic style that wanders all over the place but never stops playing by its own eerie rulebook."

In September, 2014, it was announced that Butter on the Latch and Thou Wast Mild and Lovely had been picked up for a theatrical and VOD distribution by Cinelicious Pics with a planned release set for November, 2014.

Decker has also appeared as an actor in many independent films, including Joe Swanberg's Uncle Kent, Onur Tukel's Richard's Wedding, Saturday Morning Mystery, the romantic tragedy Loves Her Gun, and Stephen Cone's Black Box.In November 2015, Decker served on the Jury of the 33rd Torino Film Festival. The festival had paid tribute to her work in the Onde section in 2014.

Decker co-directed with Zefrey Throwell the 2017 documentary Flames. As Deadline put it, "Shot over the course of five years, the project charts the immensely passionate and profound relationship between the two artists, watching the spectacular romance, excitement and adventure of their relationship at its peak, and the fallout as Decker and Throwell clash, falling out of love with each other."

Decker’s third feature film, Madeline's Madeline, screened at the Sundance and Berlin film festivals in early 2018. It features Molly Parker and Miranda July, and introduces 19-year-old Helena Howard as a troubled acting student whose "class exercises become increasingly immersive and personal".

In 2020, Neon distributed Decker's feature Shirley, inspired by the life of author Shirley Jackson. The film starred Elisabeth Moss and Michael Stuhlbarg, and was produced by Christine Vachon and executive produced by Martin Scorsese. On RogerEbert.com, critic Sheila O'Malley called it Decker's "most ambitious film to date."

In a change of pace, Decker directed the coming-of-age drama The Sky is Everywhere, which was released in 2022 by Apple+ and A24. In an interview, Decker said, "I think I was really ready to make something that was a little lighter and had more lightness and less gritty, dark, violent, sexual. Probably for my next movie, I’ll go back into it hard, but this was a nice little respite."

Performance art
In May 2010, Decker attended the last day of Marina Abramović's retrospective The Artist Is Present at MoMA. As she sat down across from Abramovic, Decker immediately disrobed and stood naked in the middle of the museum until seven security guards escorted her out over the museum’s no-nudity policy.

Decker declared that her goal was to be "as vulnerable to [Abramovic] as she constantly makes herself to us."

Influences
Decker cites as influences the films Antichrist (2009), Black Swan (2010), Eternal Sunshine of the Spotless Mind (2004), Silent Light (2007), and Days of Heaven (1978), the book East of Eden'', director Joe Swanberg and frequent collaborator Sarah Small.

Personal life
Decker grew up as a Christian, and is now a Buddhist, having practiced the religion since at least 2011.

Filmography

Television

References

External links

Official website

1981 births
Living people
American film actresses
American Buddhists
American women film directors
American women performance artists
American performance artists
Converts to Buddhism from Christianity
Film directors from Texas
Princeton University alumni
Sundance Film Festival award winners
21st-century American women